Peter McIntyre (born 24 August 1927) is an Australian architect and educator.

Biography
Educated at Trinity Grammar School, Royal Melbourne Institute of Technology and Melbourne University, he founded a practice in 1950 that combined modern, high-technology materials with concern for "emotional functionalism," or the impact of the built environment on its occupants. His design for an environmentally adapted Mallee Hospital was lauded by critic Robin Boyd as the beginning of a new Australian architecture. In 1953, he founded the McIntyre Partnership Pty Ltd. where he served as practice director, principal and senior partner.

McIntyre formed a partnership with architects John and Phyllis Murphy and Kevin Borland and in collaboration with engineering consultant Bill Irwin, they designed the Melbourne Olympic Swimming pool in 1952. He was also the architect for the redevelopment of the pool to the Lexus Centre. 
In 1972, McIntyre formed an additional partnership with George Connor and Donald Wolbrink and form International PlanningCollaborative (Interplan). He wrote the 1973 Strategy Plan for the City of Melbourne, which limited high rise development to its eastern and western shoulders. His major projects include Melbourne's Parliament Station, The Jam Factory Complex in South Yarra, the Westfield Knox in Wantirna South and the creation of the Dinner Plain alpine village near Mount Hotham, Victoria. He was the Professor of Architecture at Melbourne University between 1988 and 1992 and has won numerous awards. His wife Dione is also an architect.

Architectural career outlines
 1944-50 Studied architecture, graduating in 1950
 1950-53 Commenced practice and in 1953 formed partnership: Borland, Murphy & McIntyre
 1956-61 Formed partnership: Peter and Dione McIntyre & Associates
 1961 Combined with R. H. McIntyre & Associates to form McIntyre, McIntyre & Partners Pty Ltd
 1968 President, Victorian Chapter, Royal Australian Institute of Architects
 1972 Formed additional partnership with George Connor and Donald Wolbrink as the International Planning Collaborative - Interplan
 1973-74 President, Royal Australian Institute of Architects
 1974 Senior Partner, McIntyre Partnership Pty Ltd
 1987 Appointed to the Chair of Architecture, The University of Melbourne
 1982 Awarded Officer of the Order of Australia
 1984 Chairman, Board of Directors, Dinner Plain Pty Ltd
 1990 Awarded RAIA Gold Medal
 1993 Conferred as Doctor of Architecture, honoris causa
 1994 Appointed Emeritus Professor of Architecture, The University of Melbourne
 1994 Appointed Honorary Fellow of the American Institute of Architects
 1999 Active Practice Director, McIntyre Partnership Pty Ltd

Professional service highlights
 1963 Councillor, Royal Victorian Institute of Architects
 1965 Appointed to the Architects Registration Board of Victoria
 1966 Appointed to the Mount Buller Committee of Management (1966–71)
 1968 President, Victorian Chapter, Royal Australian Institute of Architects
 1970 Appointed to the Timber Industry Advisory Board; Chairman, awards jury, Royal Australian Institute of Architects; Chairman, Metric Committee, Royal Australian; Institute of Architects;
 1971 Director of the Architects' Revue, Royal Australian Institute of Architects
 1972 Chairman, Sunbury Convention, Royal Australian Institute of Architects
 1973 Member of the National Building & Construction Council, Australia
 1973-74 President, Royal Australian Institute of Architects
 1977-78 Director of the Architects' Revue, Royal Australian Institute of Architects
 1978 Appointed to the Fountains Trust
 1980 Appointed to Trinity Grammar School Council
 1984 Chairman, Board of Directors, Dinner Plain Pty Ltd
 1986 Chairman, National Trust Maritime Museum
 1990 President, Trinity Grammar School Council
 1993 Chairman, Design Review Committee (Crown Casino), Melbourne Casino Authority
 1994 Appointed Honorary Fellow of the American Institute of Architects
 1995 Chairman, competition jury for Museum of Victoria
 2001 Chairman, competition jury for Spencer Street Station (now Southern Cross Station
 2004 Chairman, competition jury for RAIA Heritage Award
 2006 Convenor, restoration appeal, and Architect, Kew Court House

Competitions
 1952	Olympic Swimming Pool (Melbourne) Competition 1952 winner.
 1957	Academy of Science (Canberra) Competition 1957 finalist.
 1958	Stawell Swimming Pool Competition 1958  winner.
 1969	National Gallery (Canberra) Competition finalist.
 1979	National Archives Competition finalist.

Academic activities
 1944 Inaugural member and joint founder of RMIT Student's Representative Council
 1948 Founder and Director, Architects' Revue, The University of Melbourne
 1949-54 Director, Architects' Revue, The University of Melbourne
 1950 Appointed as a tutor, School of Architecture, The University of Melbourne
 1951-53 4th Year tutor, School of Architecture, The University of Melbourne
 1953-56 Lectured on design principles of Olympic Swimming Pool to students/graduates/public
 1957-1960 Ateliers, evenings
 1957 Lecturer in Charge, final year design, Department of Architecture, RMIT
 1971 Appointed to Standing Committee for Chair of Architecture, The University of Melbourne
 1985 Professorial Associate, Department of Architecture, The University of Melbourne
 1987 Appointed to the Chair of Architecture, The University of Melbourne
 1990 Delivered the A. S. Hook Memorial Address, The University of Melbourne
 1994 Appointed Emeritus Professor of Architecture, The University of Melbourne

McIntrye's titles are: AO,  DArch, BArch, DipArch, DipTRP, LFRAIA,  FRAPI, FAIA, Emeritus Professor of Architecture - University of Melbourne.

Awards
 Architecture Arts Award 1954. Project: Snelleman House, Melbourne
 RAIA Architecture & Arts Award 1954/55. Project: McIntyre House, Melbourne
 Building of the Year 1956. Project: Olympic Swimming Pool, Melbourne
 Sir James Barrett Memorial Medal 1974 Project: Melbourne Strategy Plan
 RAIA Architectural Projects Award 1975. Project: The Jam Factory, Melbourne
 RAIA Urban & Community Design Bronze medal. Project: Melbourne Strategy Plan
 IES Meritorious Lighting Award 1978. Project: Westfield Knox, Victoria
 RAIA Award 1978 Bronze medal. Project: Westfield Knox, Victoria
 RAIA Merit Award 1980. Project: Kyla Park Housing Development, NSW
 RAIA Robin Boyd Medal 1983. Project:Seahouse, Victoria 
 RAIA Sir Zelman Cowen Medal 1985. Project: Parliament Station, Melbourne
 RAIA Merit Award 1985. Project: Parliament Station, Melbourne
 RAIA Sir Zelman Cowen Medal 1987 Project: Dinner Plain Alpine Village, Victoria 
 RAIA Gold Medal 1990 awarded to Peter McIntyre 
 Institute of Architects Commendation Award 2013. Project Richard and Elizabeth Tudor Centre at Trinity Grammar 
 Victorian Architecture Awards 2014 Best Enduring Architecture

Film
 1960 Your House and Mine, directed by Peter McIntyre, distributed by State Film Centre.

References

Further reading
 1995 Heroic Melbourne: Architecture of The 1950s by Norman Day, RMIT, Melbourne, 1995  
 1990 June: Architecture Australia, Vol.79 No.25 pp. 30–33, Struggle For Meaning by Peter McIntyre.
 1990 June: Architecture Australia  Vol.79 No.25 pp. 34–53, Optimism and Experiment by Philip Goad.
 1990 June: Architecture Australia, Vol.79 No.25 pp. 58–60, Dinner Plain: With Gusto by Jeff Turnbull. 
 1990 June: Architecture Australia  Vol.79 No.25 pp. 61–70, No Plain Sailing by Rob McIntyre 
 1983	Dinner Plain Village Environmental Effects Statement.
 1978	Mount Baw Baw Plan.
 1976	Mount Buller Village Plan.
 1976	Underground railway stations - research in Europe and USA (for Melbourne Underground Loop Authority).
 1976	Jam Factory Environmental Impact Statement (The first such statement ever requested by Melbourne Metropolitan Planning Authority).
 1978	Mount Hotham Village Plan.
 1973	Melbourne Strategy Plan, pub. Melbourne City Council.
 1970	RAIA Metric Conversion Report. (Building Construction Advisory Committee, Metric Conversion Board of Australia)
 1969	RAIA Services Company Project.
 1969	Comprehensive Architectural Services, RAIA Convention.
 1968	Ski Resort Development Post.
 1968	Melbourne Architectural Oration Series.
 1964	Alpine Building Regulations (for RAIA, incorporated into Uniform Building Regulations of Victoria).
 1955	Evaluation of Olympic Swimming Stadium.
 1951-1953 "Cross Section", architectural newsletter, The University of Melbourne.

External links
 McIntyre Partnership
 By Design ABC: Home of the Month - Peter McIntyre's house

1927 births
Living people
Architects from Melbourne
Recipients of the Royal Australian Institute of Architects’ Gold Medal